Argentina men's national goalball team is the men's national team of Argentina.  Goalball is a team sport designed specifically for athletes with a vision impairment.  The team takes part in international goalball competitions.

World Championships

2018 Malmö 

The team competed in the 2018 World Championships from 3 to 8 June 2018, at the Baltiska Hallen, Malmö, Sweden.  There were sixteen men's and twelve women's teams.  They placed seventh in Pool A, and thirteenth in final standings.  

Athletes included: Alejandro Almada, and Matias Fernando Britez.

2022 Matosinhos 

The team competed in the 2022 World Championships from 7 to 16 December 2022, at the Centro de Desportos e Congressos de Matosinhos, Portugal.  There were sixteen men's and sixteen women's teams.  They placed seventh in Pool D, and eleventh in final standings.

IBSA World Games

2007 São Paulo 

The team competed in the 2007 IBSA World Games, from 28 July 2007 to 8 August 2007, in São Paulo, Brazil.  There were twenty-three men's and twelve women's teams.  

The team formed part of Group E, but did not make the quarter-finals.  Team athletes included Matiaz Britez, Patricio Finoli, Luis Flores, and Diego Rodrigues.

Regional championships 

The team competes in the IBSA America goalball region.  The winner of the championships usually qualifies for a berth at the World Championships or the Paralympic Games.

2005 São Paulo 

The team competed at the 2005 IBSA Goalball Americas Regional Championships which were part of the Fourth IBSA Pan-American Games, the competition being from Monday 5 September 2005 to Friday 9 September 2005, in São Paulo, Brazil.  There were five men's and three women's teams.  There were five men's teams: Argentina, Brazil, Canada, Mexico, and USA.  

The team came fifth of the five countries.

2017 São Paulo 

The team competed at the 2017 IBSA Goalball Americas Championships from Wednesday 29 November 2017 to Sunday 3 December 2017, at São Paulo, Brazil.  There were eight men's teams: Argentina, Brazil, Canada, Costa Rica, Mexico, Peru, USA, and Venezuela (Costa Rica were disqualified for not having the minimum number of athletes to start a game).

The team came fourth, behind Brazil, USA, and Canada.

2019 Lima 

The team competed at the 2019 Parapan American Games from 23 August 2019 to 1 September 2019, at the Miguel Grau Coliseum, Lima, Peru.  This championships was a qualifier for the 2020 Paralympic Games.  There were eight men's teams: Argentina, Brazil, Canada, Guatemala, Mexico, Peru, USA, Venezuela.

The team did not place in the top four.

2022 São Paulo 

Due to the ongoing COVID-19 pandemic, the IBSA America championships moved from 6 to 13 November 2021, to 18 to 22 February 2022.  The event was held at the Centro de Treinamento Paralímpico (Paralympic Training Center) in São Paulo.  This championships was a qualifier for the 2022 World Championships.  

There are thirteen men's teams: Argentina, Brazil, Canada, Chile, Colombia, Costa Rica, Guatemala, Mexico, Nicaragua, Peru, Puerto Rico, USA, Venezuela.

The team played well in their round-robin games, with two mercies (Chile (14:4), Colombia (13:3)), beating two other teams (Nicaragua (13:5), Venezuela (7:6), and Peru (16:9)), but being mercied by the tournament's eventual gold medalists Brazil (4:14).  Progressing into the quarter-finals, they were mercied by Canada (12:2), concluding with one minute left in the first half.

See also 

 Disabled sports 
 Argentina women's national goalball team 
 Argentina at the Paralympics

References

National men's goalball teams
Argentina at the Paralympics
Goalball in the Americas